Princess María de las Mercedes of Bavaria, Infanta of Spain (3 October 1911 – 11 September 1953) was a German-Spanish princess. She was the third wife of Georgian Prince Irakli Bagration of Mukhrani. Through her father, Prince Ferdinand of Bavaria, she was a member of the Bavarian House of Wittelsbach. Through her mother, Infanta María Teresa of Spain, she was a granddaughter of Alfonso XII and niece of Alfonso XIII.

Early life
Princess María de las Mercedes of Bavaria, Infanta of Spain, was born on 3 October 1911 at the Palace of the Cuesta de la Vega, Madrid, to Prince Ferdinand of Bavaria and Infanta María Teresa of Spain. Her parents were first cousins, both grandchildren of Isabella II of Spain. Prior to her birth, her uncle, King Alfonso XIII, declared that any children born of her parents' marriage would be Infantes or Infantas of Spain. She was christened María de las Mercedes Teresa María de la Paz Fernanda Adalberta Cristina Antonia Isidra Raimunda Josefa Jesusa Fausta Francisca de Borja y Todos los Santos on 11 October 1911 at the Royal Palace of Madrid. Her godparents were Infanta María de la Paz of Spain (her paternal grandmother) and Prince Adalbert of Bavaria (her paternal uncle, for whom Prince Carlos of Bourbon-Two Sicilies stood proxy). She had two elder brothers, Luis Alfonso (1906–1983) and José Eugenio (1909–1966), and one younger sister, María del Pilar (1912–1918). Her mother died in 1912. Her father remarried her late mother's lady-in-waiting, Doña María Luisa de Silva y Fernandez de Henestrosa, Duchess of Talavera de la Reina.

Following the establishment of the Second Spanish Republic in 1931, the family fled to Germany.

Marriage and issue
On 29 August 1946, Infanta María de las Mercedes married Prince Irakli Bagration of Mukhrani at Miramar Palace in San Sebastián. 

Against the advice of Grand Duke Vladimir Kirillovich of Russia, Infante Juan, Count of Barcelona, head of the Spanish royal family in exile, did not recognize the union as dynastic. Therefore, her children were not in the line of succession to the Spanish throne. In 1948, Irakli's sister, Leonida, married Grand Duke Vladimir, which the Grand Duke considered dynastic. 

They had two children: 
 Princess Mariam Bagration of Mukhrani (born 27 June 1947)
 Prince Bagrat Bagration of Mukhrani (12 January 1949 – 20 March 2017)

Princess María de las Mercedes died on 11 September 1953 in Madrid from a pre-existing heart condition. She is buried in the Pantheon of the Princes at the Royal Site of San Lorenzo de El Escorial.

Honours
 Dame of Honor and Devotion of the Sovereign Military Order of Malta

Arms

Ancestors

References

External links
"HA FALLECIDO LA INFANTA DOÑA MARIA MERCEDES DE BAVIERA" (abc.es, 12 September 1953)

1911 births
1953 deaths
Bavarian princesses
Spanish infantas
House of Wittelsbach
House of Bourbon (Spain)
House of Mukhrani
People from Madrid
Burials in the Pantheon of Infantes at El Escorial